Urs Jaeggi (23 June 1931 in Solothurn – 13 February 2021 in Berlin) was a Swiss sociologist, painter, and author from Solothurn, Switzerland. From 1964 to 1993, he was a Professor of Sociology and Social Philosophy in Bern, Bochum, New York, and Berlin. He published numerous novels, short stories, essays as well as scientific books. He won the Ingeborg Bachmann Prize in 1981.

As a visual artist participated in solo and group exhibitions from 1985 on. He lived in Berlin and Mexico City.

His daughter Rahel Jaeggi is a professor of philosophy at the Humboldt University of Berlin.

Urs Jaeggi died on 13 February 2021 at the age of 89.

References

External links 
 
 

20th-century Swiss novelists
21st-century Swiss novelists
20th-century Swiss painters
Swiss male painters
21st-century Swiss painters
21st-century Swiss male artists
1931 births
2021 deaths
Academic staff of the Free University of Berlin
Swiss writers in German
Ingeborg Bachmann Prize winners
Academic staff of Ruhr University Bochum
Swiss essayists
Swiss sculptors
Swiss sociologists
The New School faculty
Academic staff of the University of Bern
Swiss expatriates in Germany
People from Solothurn
20th-century Swiss male artists